Vazhiye is a 2022 Indian Malayalam-language independent found footage horror film written and directed by Nirmal Baby Varghese after Thariode. This movie is an experimental movie made in found footage style and it is the first found footage movie in Malayalam. Produced by Baby Chaithanya under the banner of Casablanca Film Factory. The film marked the debut of Hollywood music director Evan Evans in Indian cinema.

Premise
The film narrates the story of two YouTube vloggers that decide to make a documentary film about a mystery land, where they confront perilous, nightmarish situations.

Cast 
 Jeffin Joseph
 Aswathi Anil Kumar
 Varun Ravindran
 Shyam Salash
 Shalini Baby
 Joji Tomy
 Saniya Poulose
 Rajan

Production

Development 
On 4 March 2019, The New Indian Express reported that Nirmal was working on his next project titled Vazhiye, a found-footage horror film. Nirmal announced Vazhiye on his facebook on 31 August 2020. The film is produced by Baby Chaithanya under the banner of Casablanca Film Factory in association with Vivid Frames. American Evan Evans was signed as the composer.

Filming 
Principal photography began on 28 September 2020 with a customary pooja function held at Chittarikkal, Kasaragod. Other primary filming locations were in Badoor, Pulingome, Cherupuzha, Kanamvayal and around the Kasaragod-Karnataka border. Shooting was wrapped on 20 October 2020 at Konnakkad.

Soundtrack
The original background score and theme music is composed by American film score composer Evan Evans.

Release
The film screened at the Toronto Indie Horror Film Fest in May 2022.

Home Media
Film started streaming on the American OTT platform Diverse Cinema from 11 June 2022. Also available for streaming on Amazon Prime Video from 12 August 2022.

Awards and accolades

Awards

Film festival official selections

See also
 Found footage (film technique)
 List of ghost films
 List of Malayalam horror films

References

External links
 
 

2020s Malayalam-language films
Found footage films
Indian crime thriller films
Films shot in Kannur
Films shot in Karnataka